The Boy Sherlock Holmes series of novels, by Shane Peacock, are the childhood exploits of the famous fictional detective Sherlock Holmes. All are published by Tundra Books simultaneously in Canada and the U.S. (and appear in other countries and languages, including China, France, Vietnamese, Indonesia, and Spain).

Books in the series
Eye of the Crow (2007) : 13-year-old Sherlock tries to solve a murder of a London woman. His involvement may have worse consequences than thought.
Death in the Air (2008) : Sherlock witnesses a famous trapeze artist's "accidental" death. His rivalry with Malefactor become more personal. His persistence in the case leads to shocking dangers and embarrassments.
Vanishing Girl (2010) : A well-to-do London girl vanishes. When she re-appears unharmed, Sherlock senses foul play. Is there a connection with the deserted mansion where exotic animals lurk?
Secret Fiend (2010) : When Sherlock's childhood playmate claims she saw a long dead London terrorist, he starts investigating. Close friends become suspects. A young orphan boy may have a shocking connection to the Doyle family.
Dragon Turn (2011) : Sherlock and Irene watch a magician be arrested for murder. Sherlock has doubts about the suspect. The murder weapon may turn out to be a rare unknown species of...Dragon? Sherlock has his doubts.
Becoming Holmes (2012) : Sherlock's enemies are spinning a web of lies.

Reception
Eye of the Crow was selected as a Booklist "Top Ten in Young Mysteries" and was a winner of the Arthur Ellis Award for Juvenile Crime Fiction.

School Library Journal called the series "spellbinding" and stated that "Younger YAs will be captivated by Shane Peacock’s The Boy Sherlock Holmes, a series of novels".

All have won Junior Library Guild of America Premier Selection Awards. The series as a whole has garnered more than 40 awards, nominations, and honors.

Adaptation
In November 2022, it was announced that The Boy Sherlock Holmes series would be adapted as a co-production between Productivity Media and Wind Sun Sky Entertainment with Matt Cirulnick writing.

See also

The Enola Holmes Mysteries
Young Sherlock Holmes (books)
Young Sherlock Holmes

References

External links
Author's Website
Official site of The Boy Sherlock Holmes series
Publisher's Website

Crime novel series
Young adult novel series
Canadian young adult novels
Novels set in Victorian England
Sherlock Holmes novels
Sherlock Holmes pastiches
Prequel novels